Capital punishment in Islam is traditionally regulated by the Islamic law (sharīʿa), which derived from the Quran, ḥadīth literature, and sunnah (accounts of the sayings and living habits attributed to the Islamic prophet Muhammad during his lifetime). Crimes according to the sharīʿa law which could result in capital punishment include apostasy from Islam, murder, rape, adultery, homosexuality, etc. Death penalty is in use in many Muslim-majority countries, where it is utilised as sharīʿa-prescribed punishment for crimes such as apostasy from Islam, adultery, witchcraft, homosexuality, murder, rape, and publishing pornography.

Capital crimes and sentencing
Both the hadiths and the Quran mention specific crimes for which capital punishment is a valid punishment.  In the four primary schools of Sunni fiqh (Islamic jurisprudence) and the two primary schools of Shi'a fiqh, certain types of crimes mandate capital punishment.

Qisas
Qisas is a category of sentencing where sharia permits capital punishment, for intentional or unintentional murder. In the case of death, sharia gives the murder victim's nearest relative or Wali a right to, if the court approves, take the life of the killer.
hudud crimes, which are crimes against God, and are considered the most serious offences under sharia law, for which punishments are prescribed in the Quran. This includes banditry and adultery; and

Further, in case of Qisas-related capital punishment, sharia offers the victim's guardian the option of [[Diyya]] (monetary compensation).

Diyya is controversial, especially when paid to avoid trial for crimes such as murder.  Concerns been raised that poor offenders face trial and capital punishment while wealthy offenders avoid even a trial by paying off Qisas compensation. The Murder of Shahzeb Khan in 2012 brought particular attention to this issue in Pakistan.

Hudud
Certain hudud crimes, for example, are considered crimes against Allah and require capital punishment in public. These include apostasy (leaving Islam to become an atheist or convert to another religion), fasad (mischief in the land, or moral corruption against Allah, social disturbance and creating disorder within the Muslim state) and zina (consensual heterosexual or homosexual relations not allowed by Islam, specifically pre marital or extramarital).

Modern applications
Muslim-majority nations carry out a large percentage of the world's executions. In the year 2020, an Amnesty International report found that 88 percent of all recorded executions took place in either Iran, Egypt, Iraq or Saudi Arabia.  However, 'all recorded executions' did not include data from China, where the number of executions is classified information. In several Islamic countries such as Sunni Saudi Arabia and Pakistan, as well as Shia Iran, both hudud and qisas type capital punishment is part of the legal system and in use. In others, there is variation in the use of capital punishment.

Several Muslim-majority nations have not performed an execution in several decades, though death sentences may still be given. Leaders in Algeria and Tunisia, which have not executed criminals since the early 1990s, have recently suggested a return to capital punishment.

Methods
Lethal stoning and beheading in public under sharia is controversial for being a cruel form of capital punishment. These forms of execution remain part of the law enforced in Saudi Arabia, Yemen, Qatar, United Arab Emirates, Iran and Mauritania. However no stoning has been implemented for many years.

Quotations regarding stoning can be seen in hadiths including the following:

Decapitation

Decapitation was a standard method of execution in pre-modern Islamic law. The use of decapitation for punishment continued well into the 20th century in both Islamic and non-Islamic nations. When done properly, it was once considered a humane and honorable method of execution.

Today, its use had been abandoned in most countries by the end of the 20th century. Decapitation is a legal method of execution in Saudi Arabia, Qatar, Yemen, and was reportedly used in 2001 in Iran according to Amnesty International, where it is no longer in use.

Decapitation in Islamic scripture

There is a debate as to whether the Quran discusses decapitation. Two surahs could potentially be used to provide a justification for decapitation in the context of war:

When the Lord inspired the angels (saying) I am with you. So make those who believe stand firm. I will throw fear into the hearts of those who disbelieve. Then smite the necks and smite of them each finger. (8:12)
Now when ye meet in battle those who disbelieve, then it is smiting of the necks until, when ye have routed them, making fast of bonds; and afterward either grace or ransom 'til the war lay down its burdens. (47:4)

Among classical commentators, Fakhr al-Din al-Razi interprets the last sentence of 8:12 to mean striking at the enemies in any way possible, from their head to the tips of their extremities. Al-Qurtubi reads the reference to striking at the necks as conveying the gravity and severity of the fighting. For al-Qurtubi, al-Tabari, and Ibn Kathir, the expression indicates the brevity of the act, as it is confined to battle and is not a continuous command.

Some commentators have suggested that terrorists use alternative interpretations of these surahs to justify beheading captives, however there is agreement among scholars that they have a different meaning. Furthermore, according to Rachel Saloom, surah 47:4 goes on to recommend generosity or ransom when waging war, and it refers to a period when Muslims were persecuted and had to fight for their survival.

Decapitation in Islamic law 

Decapitation was the normal method of executing the death penalty under classical Islamic law. It was also, together with hanging, one of the ordinary methods of execution in the Ottoman Empire.

Currently, Saudi Arabia is the only country in the world which uses decapitation within its Islamic legal system.  The majority of executions carried out by the Wahhabi government of Saudi Arabia are public beheadings, which usually cause mass gatherings but are not allowed to be photographed or filmed.

According to Amnesty, decapitation have been carried out by state authorities in Iran as recently as 2001, but as of 2014 is no longer in use.
It is also a legal form of execution in Qatar and Yemen, but the punishment has been suspended in those countries.

Historical occurrences 
 The Islamic followers of Mohammed executed the men of the Jewish tribe of Banu Qurayza for an alleged treaty violation, with several hundred killed in 627.
 After the Battle of Hattin (1187), Saladin personally beheaded Raynald of Châtillon; a Christian knight who served in the Second Crusade and organized attacks against Islam's two holiest cities.
Forces of the Ottoman Empire invaded and laid siege to the city of Otranto and its citadel in 1480. According to a traditional account, after capture, more than 800 of its inhabitants – who refused to convert to Islam – were beheaded. They are known as the "Martyrs of Otranto". Historicity of this account has been questioned by modern scholars.
 Muhammad Ahmad declared himself Mahdi in 1880 and led Jihad against the Ottoman Empire and their British allies. He and his followers beheaded opponents, Christian and Muslim alike including the British general Charles Gordon.

See also

Capital and corporal punishment in Judaism
Raif Badawi
Religion and capital punishment#Islam
Public executions in Saudi Arabia
Capital punishment in Saudi Arabia

References

Sharia
Corporal punishments
Punishments in religion
Islamic ethics